Ramdurg is a town in Belagavi district in the Indian state of Karnataka. The name of the town derives from Rama, as it is believed that Lord Ram, lived here during his exile. The town gives its name to Ramdurg taluka, a subdivision of Belgaum district.

History

The royal state of Ramdurg, founded in 1799, was one of the non-salute princely states of British India under the Bombay Presidency and later the Deccan States Agency. The Konkanasth dynasty area measures . According to the 1901 census, the population was 37,848. Ramdurg acceded to the Dominion of India on 8 March 1948, and is currently part of Karnataka state.

Location

Ramdurg is known for its hills, sugar factories, river and trekking. 
There are many important places near Ramdurg, such as Shabari Kolla, Godachi, Navilu Teerth, Big Shiva Statue, Hoovina Kolla, Sunnal Hanumappa, Megundappan Kolla, Ramdurg Forts and Toragal Forts. Almost all villages that come under Ramdurg talluk are historic places.

Demographics
According to the national census, the town had a population of 29,651 in 1991, rising to 36,649 in 2001 and declining to 34,800 in 2011.  The population is virtually equal between males and females. The town is considered 100% urban.

The unemployment rate is 60%, well above the national average of 3.46%. There is 37.5% "usually employed", 4.6% "casually employed" and 57.9% not employed. These terms describing levels of employment are from the Indian census process.

The 2011 census indicated a relatively high literacy rate.  Although there are different numbers with a declining trend, the official census in 2011 reported that 81.8% of the local residents were literate.

Culture
Godachi Fair at Godachi,  from Ramdurg, is a major fair of the district held in December, attracting people from Siddu Khanpeth, Torgal, Halolli, Sunnal, Budnur, Batakurki, Halgatti, Sureban, Katkol, Chandaragi, Salahalli, Obalapura and Mudkavi. 

Moharm festival is held at Yarikittur village.

 away is Sureban and Manihal, a rich holy place which is a popular tourist destination. There are several temples including:
 Shree Shabhari Deevi – located in a dense forest with dramatic changes during the seasons. There is a belief that Shabari was waiting for Rama in this place.
 Shree Atmananda Aasharma 
 Shree Shivananda Hill (Betta)
 Shree Manageramma Hill 
 Shree Falahaareswara Temple
 Ramatirtha

Sureban is also amongst the few places in India where 'ChithaBasma' (Ashes) of Father of Nation Mahathma Gandhiji has been kept.

This village is the location of a Maruthi Temple, popularly known as "Sunnal Hanumappa", which has an idol of Lord Hanuman from ancient times. It is believed by thousands of devotees that by praying to Lord Hanuman at Sunnal, one will be blessed twice by the lord Hanuman as his idol is seen by the devotees by both eyes. The stretch of forest along Sunnal and Halloli has bears known as "Sunnal Karadi" or "Sunnal Kaddi" in Kannada.
Most famous local fare war 

venkateshwar (vekappana teru) which teru (ತೇರು) it will turn full one round in right side direction it was most famous

Statue of Lord Shiva on the outskirts of Ramdurg.

Hospitals

Hospitals within Ramdurg include:Kulgod Multispeciality Hospital
Biggest hospital for all specialities in ramdurga. 
Others include Shree Sai Multispeciality Dental Hospital, Apte Hospital, Bilagi Hospital, Government Hospital, Kulkarni Hospital, Dhoot Hospital, Agadi Hospital, Kanbur Hospital, Kambi Hospital, Patavardan Hospital, Guru Hospital, Pavate Hospital, Gunda Pediatric Hospital and many more.

Transport

The KSRTC (Karnataka State Road Transport Corporation) bus facility connects to major cities of Karnataka and also Pune, Aurungabad, Tuljapur and south Maharashtra.

VRL Logistics provides private bus services from Ramdurg to Bangalore  .

Education
Schools within Ramdurg include: Adarsha vidyalaya ,C.D. Hallyal High School, Taluka Anjuman High School, Government Urdu High School, Pragati Vidyalaya, Samarpana vdyapeetha, Government Boys and Girls School, Vidya Prasark Samiti school, Basaveshawar High School, Cambridge English Medium School, C.S. Bembalagi Science College, Smt. I.S. Yadawad Govt. First Grade degree College, Govt. P.U. College, Smt. Nagamma Kulgod Para Medical Sciences.  Many more schools exist within Ramdurg.

Banks
Many banks are present in Ramdurg, such as State Bank of India, Krantiveera Sangolli Rayanna Co-operative Bank, Union Bank of India, ICICI Bank, IDFC Bank, Syndicate Bank, KVG Bank, Raddi Co-operative Bank, etc.

References

External links 
 List of rulers of Ramdurg

Cities and towns in Belagavi district
Forts in Belagavi district